The Society of Catholic Social Scientists (SCSS) is a US-based non-profit organization founded in 1992 by Stephen M. Krason of Franciscan University of Steubenville at the Pittsburgh Hilton hotel and recognized as a non-profit by the US Internal Revenue Service in 1999. The SCSS offers a Master of Theology degree program in Catholic social thought at Steubenville, Ohio, as well as holding an annual meeting and conference, and publushing an academic journal, The Catholic Social Science Review.

The organization's mission is to "bring rigorous, credible scholarship to political, social and economic questions"  through a collegiality of Catholic scholars, professors, researchers, practitioners, and writers who "approach their work in both a scholarly and evangelical spirit."  The organization publishes The Catholic Social Science Review, an interdisciplinary, peer-reviewed journal of original articles and reviews in the social sciences and the humanities.

They are expected to strictly observe the highest scholarly and professional requirements of their disciplines as they examine their data in light of church teaching and the natural law. In this way, the society seeks to obtain objective knowledge about the social order, provide solutions to vexing social problems, and further the cause of Christ.

References

External links
 

Catholicism in the United States
Catholic lay organisations
Non-profit organizations based in the United States
Social sciences organizations
Christian organizations based in the United States
Catholic organizations established in the 20th century
Christian organizations established in 1992
1992 establishments in Pennsylvania